Dan-Andrei Muraru (born May 20, 1982) is a Romanian historian and diplomat.

Muraru was born in Iași and grew up in the city's  neighborhood. He graduated from the history faculty of Alexandru Ioan Cuza University in Iași in 2005. He earned a master’s degree from the same institution in 2007, and a doctorate in 2011, with a thesis on the war crimes trials for Transnistria Governorate. From 2012 to 2014, he headed the Institute for the Investigation of Communist Crimes in Romania. He began teaching at Bucharest’s National University of Political Studies and Public Administration in 2018. He has been an adviser to Klaus Iohannis since summer 2014, several months before the latter became President of Romania.

In 2021, Iohannis named Muraru ambassador of Romania to the United States. His twin brother  is a historian and politician.

Notes

External links

1982 births
Diplomats from Iași
Romanian twins
Alexandru Ioan Cuza University alumni
Academic staff of the National University of Political Studies and Public Administration
Romanian historians
Romanian presidential advisors
Ambassadors of Romania to the United States
Historians of the Holocaust
Historians of communism
Living people